Cetichthys is a genus of flabby whalefishes.

Species
There are currently two recognized species in this genus:
 Cetichthys indagator (Rofen, 1959)
 Cetichthys parini Paxton, 1989

References

Cetomimidae